Ayabonga Sonjica (born 27 June 1991 in East London, Eastern Cape) is a South African boxer. At the 2012 Summer Olympics, he competed in the Men's bantamweight, but was defeated in the first round by Detelin Dalakliev of Bulgaria.  He competed at the 2014 Commonwealth Games, where he reached the quarterfinals, losing to Sean McGoldrick.

Professional boxing record

References

External links
 

1991 births
Living people
Olympic boxers of South Africa
Boxers at the 2012 Summer Olympics
Bantamweight boxers
Sportspeople from East London, Eastern Cape
Boxers at the 2014 Commonwealth Games
Commonwealth Games competitors for South Africa
South African male boxers
African Games bronze medalists for South Africa
African Games medalists in boxing
Competitors at the 2011 All-Africa Games